Pristava pri Leskovcu is a settlement south of Leskovec pri Krškem in the Municipality of Krško in eastern Slovenia. It lies south of the A2 motorway from Ljubljana to Zagreb and north of the Krka River. The area is part of the traditional region of Lower Carniola. It is now included with the rest of the municipality in the Lower Sava Statistical Region. Its territory includes the hamlet of Globelo southeast of the main settlement, with a hunting lodge that was known as Globelj.

Name
The name of the settlement was changed from Pristava to Pristava pri Leskovcu in 1953.

Cultural heritage
There is a small chapel-shrine in the settlement. It belongs to the Parish of Brestanica and was built in the early 20th century.

References

External links
Pristava pri Leskovcu on Geopedia

Populated places in the Municipality of Krško